Ana Ivanovic was the defending champion, but lost to Caroline Garcia in the semifinals. 

Timea Bacsinszky won her second title of the year, defeating Garcia in the final, 4–6, 6–2, 6–4.

Seeds

Draw

Finals

Top half

Bottom half

Qualifying

Seeds

Qualifiers

Draw

First qualifier

Second qualifier

Third qualifier

Fourth qualifier

References
Main Draw
Qualifying Draw

Monterrey Singles
2015 Singles